Argyria vesta is a moth in the family Crambidae. It was described by Stanisław Błeszyński in 1962. It is found in Paraná, Brazil.

References

Argyriini
Moths described in 1962
Moths of South America